Rishabh Shukla (R̥ṣabha Śuklā) is an Indian film and television actor and a voice-dubbing artist, who speaks Hindi as his mother tongue language. On television he is most known for his role of King Shantanu in Mahabharat (TV series) (1988–1990)

Filmography

Films

Television

Television advertisement
Krackjack advertisement worked with Neerja Bhanot

Dubbing career

He has been dubbing foreign films especially Hollywood films, since 1982, when he moved to Mumbai.

Dubbing roles

Live action films

See also
Dubbing (filmmaking)
List of Indian dubbing artists

References

External links
 

20th-century Indian male actors
Living people
People from Kanpur
Indian male child actors
Indian male voice actors
Indian male television actors
Male actors in Hindi cinema
21st-century Indian male actors
Year of birth missing (living people)